Kathryn Mullen  is an American puppeteer, actress, and voice actress most closely associated with Jim Henson projects.

History
Mullen began performing on The Muppet Show in its third season, primarily as Gaffer the Backstage Cat. She also voice directed Dog City for Nelvana, worked as a designer for The Muppet Movie, right-handed for Frank Oz on Yoda on The Empire Strikes Back, and was one of the creators of Between the Lions. While reprising Gaffer for several Muppet movies, she also performed Mokey Fraggle and Cotterpin Doozer on Henson's Fraggle Rock. She performed the Gelfling Kira in the movie The Dark Crystal, Allegra on Allegra's Window, and Leona the Lion on Between the Lions.

Mullen, with her husband, former Muppet designer Michael K. Frith, founded "No Strings" along with emergency aid worker Johnie McGlade.  The company originally created a film for children in Afghanistan, warning of the dangers of land mines. In the film, "The Story of the Little Carpet Boy," one puppet loses several limbs before he learns to avoid land mines completely. Since the first film, No Strings has gone on to create films for children in need in areas including Africa, Haiti, Madagascar, Sudan, and Syria. In 2016 No Strings was awarded the 2016 Adela Dwyer-St. Thomas of Villanova Peace Award from Villanova University 

In 2013, Mullen attended Dragon Con with Karen Prell and Michael K. Frith as part of the 30th Anniversary of Fraggle Rock where Kathryn Mullen performed Mokey Fraggle while Karen Prell performed Red Fraggle.

Filmography

Television
 Allegra's Window – Allegra
 Between the Lions – Leona Lion (2000–2002)
 Fraggle Rock – Mokey Fraggle, Cotterpin Doozer, Rock Hockey Hanna, Merboo Merggle, Magenta Fraggle, Mother Goose, A Pink Dancing Fraggle, Old Gypsy Lady, Wimple Fraggle, Mama Tree Bird, Sally Spotless, Tammy Shrub, Additional Muppets
 Jim Henson's Little Muppet Monsters – Penguin, Rat
 Sesame Street – Grover's Mommy, Sally Smith, Additional Muppets
 The Muppet Show – Wanda (1979) Gaffer the Cat, Mrs. Appleby, Prairie Dog, Beaker Clones, Additional Muppets
 The Wubbulous World of Dr. Seuss – Little Cat A (1996–1997), Junior Kangaroo (1996–1997), Morton the Elephant Bird (1996–1997), Mayor Stovepipe, Lieutenant Hopwood, Mrs. Casaba, Additional Muppets

Film
 A Muppet Family Christmas – Mokey Fraggle, Additional Muppets
 Billy Bunny's Animal Songs – Billy Bunny's Mother, Frog, Gopher
 John Denver and the Muppets: A Christmas Together – Additional Muppets
 Labyrinth – Goblins (puppeteer)
 Sesame Street Presents: Follow That Bird – Grouch Diner Patron, Anything Muppet Girl
 The Christmas Toy – Apple
 The Dark Crystal – Kira (puppeteer)
 The Great Muppet Caper – Gaffer the Cat, Additional Muppets
 The Muppet Movie – Additional Muppets
 The Muppets Celebrate Jim Henson – Joy Buzzer, Mokey Fraggle, Additional Muppets
 The Muppets Go Hollywood – Additional Muppets
 The Muppets Go to the Movies – Additional Muppets
 The Muppets Take Manhattan – Jill the Frog, Additional Muppets

References

External links

No Strings Productions website

Living people
Muppet performers
Fraggle Rock performers
American puppeteers
American voice actresses
American voice directors
People from New York City
Year of birth missing (living people)